WBIK (92.1 FM) — branded Classic Rock 92.1 — is a commercial classic rock radio station licensed to Pleasant City, Ohio. Owned by Joel Losego, through licensee AVC Communications, Inc., the station serves Guernsey County in East Central Ohio.  The WBIK studios are located in the Guernsey county seat of Cambridge, as is the station transmitter.

References

External links

BIK
Radio stations established in 1998
Classic rock radio stations in the United States